Granblue Fantasy The Animation is an anime adaptation of the Granblue Fantasy video game series.  The first season, animated by A-1 Pictures, aired from April 2 to June 25, 2017.  A second season, animated by MAPPA, aired from October 4 to December 27, 2019.

Characters

Gran's dream was to become a skyfarer like his father. He saves Lyria but he ends up gravely hurt. Lyria saves him in return by sharing her powers, after which they begin their journey together, along with his childhood friend Vyrn and Lyria's protector, Katalina, to evade capture by the Erste Empire, which are after Lyria for her powers. 

Lyria has the ability to connect with Primal Beasts through her powers, represented by a blue jewel. She was held hostage by the Empire for her ability as they wanted to use her in their experiments to control Primal Beasts. 

A lizard-like creature that insists that he is a dragon. He's a companion of Gran and follows him wherever he goes. He has a love for apples and has been seen to be somewhat swayed into doing something when offered an apple as a reward. 

Once a lieutenant of the Empire. She saves Lyria from a cell aboard an Empire warship and escapes. Though successful, she is branded as a traitor but believes she has done the right thing by Lyria. She is a strong sword fighter and wields a rapier. She frequently shows her skills when up against the Empire's soldiers.   

An airship pilot stranded in Port Breeze who watches over the wreckage of his ship.

A young healing mage in training.

A mysterious woman from Lumacie who is much older and wiser than she appears.

The owner of the "Knickknack Shack" who often has any items and information that the Skyfarers need.

One of the Empire's operatives who hunts down Lyria, often has a light-hearted tone that Sturm can barely tolerate.

Another of the Empire's operatives who works closely with Drang.

An alchemist, who uses countless female clones of herself as vessels.

A high-ranking officer of the Erste Empire, he reports directly to the Chancellor herself.

A ghost girl that Gran and the crew meet on the mist-shrouded island. Her past is a mystery waiting to be solved.

Media

Light novel
A light novel adaptation was released in 2014. The series currently has four books that contain game codes that can be redeemed for special items in the game. The digital volumes of the Granblue Fantasy light novel also contain game codes.

Manga
A manga adaptation began serialization on Cygames and Kodansha's Cycomi manga website in May 2016, and ended serialization in January 2020. The manga series is written by Makoto Fugetsu and illustrated by cocho. The series is licensed in North America by Kodansha USA.

Anime
An anime television series based on the franchise was announced in September 2015. The anime series is produced by A-1 Pictures and directed by Yūki Itō, featuring character designs by Toshifumi Akai, and music composed by Nobuo Uematsu, Tsutomu Narita and Yasunori Nishiki. Bump of Chicken performed the series' opening theme, titled "GO", and Haruhi performed the series' ending theme, titled . It was scheduled to premiere in January 2017, but it was delayed to April 2, 2017 for unknown reasons. An anime television special which aired the first two episodes of the anime television series was broadcast on January 21, 2017 on Tokyo MX prior to the anime series. Aniplex of America has licensed the series in North America. The 12-episode series aired from April 2 to June 18, 2017 on Tokyo MX and other channels. An extra episode "Another Sky" aired on Tokyo MX on June 25, 2017, and the Blu-ray/DVD Volume 7, released October 25, featured this and a second extra episode. MVM Films will release the series in the United Kingdom.

A second season was announced and aired from October 4 to December 27, 2019 on Tokyo MX and other channels.  The second season is produced by MAPPA. Yui Umemoto directed the second season, while Kiyoko Yoshimura served as the new scriptwriter and Fumihide Sai as the new character designer. Tsutomu Narita and Yasunori Nishiki returned to compose the music. The main cast members returned to reprise their roles.  Seven Billion Dots performed the series' opening theme, titled "Stay With Me", while adieu performed the series' ending theme . The second season ran for 14 episodes. An extra episode of the "Djeeta-hen" special, "One More Journey" aired on March 27, 2020.

Episodes

Season 1

Season 2

OVAs

Notes

References

External links
  
 

2017 anime television series debuts
A-1 Pictures
Action anime and manga
Anime television series based on video games
Aniplex franchises
Cygames franchises
Fantasy anime and manga
Granblue Fantasy
Japanese webcomics
Kodansha manga
Manga based on video games
MAPPA
Webcomics in print